The national flag of Botswana (Setswana: folaga ya Botswana) consists of a sky blue field cut horizontally in the centre by a black stripe with a thin white frame.  Adopted in 1966 to replace the Union Jack, it has been the flag of the Republic of Botswana since the country gained independence that year.  It is one of the few African flags that utilises neither the colours of the Pan-Africanist movement nor the colours of the country's leading political party.

History
In 1885, Bechuanaland became a protectorate of the United Kingdom within its colonial empire.  This occurred after the leaders of the Tswana people negotiated with the British to offer them protection from the Boers, who were invading their lands from the neighbouring South African Republic.  In spite of this newfound protection, South Africa continued to pressure the British to allow them to annex Bechuanaland into their union.  This did not occur due to widespread opposition from the Batswana people, and Bechuanaland gained independence from Britain in 1966; the new nation was renamed Botswana.

Before it gained independence, Botswana did not have its own distinctive colonial flag, with the flag of the United Kingdom serving as the de facto flag of the protectorate.  When Botswana's national flag was created in 1966, it was symbolically designed to contrast with the flag of South Africa, since the latter country was ruled under an apartheid regime.  Hence, the black stripe with the white frame came to epitomise the peace and harmony between the people of African and European descent who reside in Botswana.  The new flag was first hoisted at midnight on 30 September 1966, the day Botswana became an independent country.

Design
The colours of the flag carry cultural, political, and regional meanings.  The light blue represents water—specifically, in its form of rain, as it is a precious resource in Botswana, which relies on agriculture and suffers from frequent droughts due to the dry and arid climate of the Kalahari Desert.  The blue also alludes to the motto featured on the coat of arms of Botswana—Pula, which means "Let there be rain" in Setswana—as well as life, which is sustained by water.

The black band with the white frame has two meanings.  Firstly, they symbolise the harmony and cooperation between the people of different races who live in Botswana, as well as the racial diversity of the country.  Furthermore, they represent the stripes of the zebra, the national animal of Botswana.

Construction Sheet

Gallery

Colors

References

External links

Flags introduced in 1966
Flag
Flags of Africa
National flags
1966 establishments in Botswana